Rionegro is a town and municipality in the department of Santander in northeastern Colombia. The municipality is named after the Río Negro.

Gallery

References 

Municipalities of Santander Department
Populated places established in 1805
1805 establishments in the Spanish Empire